Gustavo "Taviche" Marroquín (died 27 March 1943) was a Salvadoran footballer who played as a striker for the El Salvador national team from 1928 to 1930.

Club career 
Marroquín played for the American football club Fortuna SC.

International career 

Marroquín scored the first five goals in the history of the El Salvador national football team during a friendly match against Honduras on 7 December 1928 which ended 5–0, El Salvador's first ever international victory.

International goals 

Scores and results list El Salvador's goal tally first.

See also 
El Salvador national football team

References 

Salvadoran footballers
El Salvador international footballers
Association football forwards
Competitors at the 1930 Central American and Caribbean Games